The 2022–23 Appalachian State Mountaineers men's basketball team represents Appalachian State University in the 2022–23 NCAA Division I men's basketball season. The Mountaineers, led by fourth-year head coach Dustin Kerns, play their home games at the Holmes Center in Boone, North Carolina as members in the Sun Belt Conference.

Previous season
The Mountaineers finished the 2021–22 season 19–15, 12–6 in Sun Belt play to finish in second place. They defeated Georgia Southern in the quarterfinals of the Sun Belt tournament before losing to Georgia State in the semifinals. The Mountaineers received an invitation to The Basketball Classic postseason tournament, formerly known as the CollegeInsider.com Tournament. There they lost in the first round to USC Upstate.

Offseason

Departures

Incoming transfers

2022 recruiting class

2023 recruiting class

Preseason

Preseason Sun Belt Conference poll
The Mountaineers were picked to finish in seventh place in the conference's preseason poll. Senior forward Donovan Gregory was named preseason All-SBC Second Team.

Roster

Schedule and results

|-
!colspan=12 style=| Non-conference regular season

|-
!colspan=12 style=| Sun Belt Conference regular season

|-
!colspan=12 style=| Sun Belt tournament

Source

References

Appalachian State Mountaineers men's basketball seasons
Appalachian State Mountaineers
Appalachian State Mountaineers men's basketball
Appalachian State Mountaineers men's basketball